Doratoptera is a genus of moths in the family Geometridae.  It was discovered in 1895.

References

https://indiabiodiversity.org/species/show/285276#habitat-and-distribution

Ennominae